8,11-Dihydroxytetrahydrocannabinol (8β,11-diOH-Δ9-THC) is an active metabolite of THC, the main active component of cannabis. The 8β enantiomer retains psychoactive effects in animal studies with only slightly lower potency than THC, while the 8α enantiomer is much weaker. Both enantiomers have a shorter half-life in the body than 11-Hydroxy-THC, making 8,11-dihydroxy-THC potentially useful for drug testing to distinguish between recent cannabis use and use longer in the past.

See also 
 3'-Hydroxy-THC
 7-Hydroxycannabidiol
 11-Hydroxy-Delta-8-THC
 11-Nor-9-carboxy-THC
 Cannabitriol

References 

Benzochromenes
Cannabinoids